Tom Kristensen (born 29 May 1955) is a Norwegian writer, best known for his books in the thriller genre.

He was born on 29 May 1955.  Kristensen has a career that includes banking, industrial management and international financial consultancy.

His first book, En kule (A Killing), was published in 2001.

He received the Riverton Prize in 2006.

Bibliography
 2001: En kule (A Killing)
 2002: Hvitvasking (Laundering)
 2003: Freshwater
 2005: Profitøren (The Profiteer)
 2006: Dødsriket (Realm of the Dead)
 2008: Dragen (The Dragon)
 2010: Dypet (The Deep)
 2012: Korsbæreren (The Crusader)

References

External links
Tom Kristensen at Aschehoug Agency
Tom Kristensen at Aschehoug Publishing House

1955 births
Living people
Norwegian thriller writers